John Michael Howell  (born 27 July 1955) is a British politician who has served as the Member of Parliament (MP) for Henley since 2008. A member of the Conservative Party, he won a by-election to replace Boris Johnson, who resigned following his election as Mayor of London.

Early life
Howell was born in Wandsworth. He studied at the University of Edinburgh and holds a doctorate in archaeology from St John's College, Oxford.

Career before Parliament
He worked as a tax inspector (1982–1985) for the Inland Revenue (now known as HM Revenue and Customs) before moving into the world of accountancy and consultancy as a tax adviser at Arthur Andersen and Ernst & Young.  He became a partner in Ernst & Young in 1990.

Howell was a business presenter for BBC World around 1994–1995, though according to Michael Crick "the most remarkable thing about his presenting, apparently, was that he used to wear a bow-tie."

In May 1996, Howell helped setup Fifth World Productions Company. He was one of the directors there until his resignation in October 2003. Howell also held directorships with associated media production companies – Land & Vision Ltd (1998–2002) and The Solution Channel Ltd (2000–2002).

In the 2000 New Year Honours, he was appointed an Officer of the Order of the British Empire (OBE) for "services to Export in Central and Eastern Europe."

Howell was a councillor on Oxfordshire County Council, serving from 2004 to 2009.

Parliamentary career
Howell first became MP for Henley at the 2008 Henley by-election, when the newly elected Mayor of London Boris Johnson resigned as MP.

Following his retaining his seat at the 2010 General Election, Howell was appointed the Parliamentary Private Secretary to the Leader of the House of Commons and the Lord Privy Seal, then Sir George Young, Bt. MP. He served on the Work and Pensions Select Committee and Justice Committee.

In 2012 Howell reported receiving death threats after responding to a question on whether he would be acting to try to halt Israeli military actions with a reference to Hamas rocket attacks in an online exchange. Howell is a member of the Parliamentary Group of the Conservative Friends of Israel. Howell declared having received free flights to and accommodation in Israel in 2012, 2015, 2016, 2018 and 2019.

Howell was opposed to Brexit prior to the 2016 referendum. He voted in favour of the withdrawal agreement of the UK from the EU, and advocated against a second referendum to ensure the referendum result was honoured.

At the Conservative Party Conference in 2017, he was quoted by the Henley Standard as saying: "My message to Boris is to keep his bloody mouth shut!" regarding Johnson's demand that the post-Brexit transition should last "not a second longer" than two years. A year later, at the party conference in 2018, when Theresa May was reportedly being undermined by Johnson, The Guardian reported Howell as saying: "As far as I'm concerned Boris can just fuck off."

In 2019, following the election of Johnson to the leadership of the Conservative Party, Howell was quoted by the Henley Standard as saying: "Boris has been elected by a large majority of the party members and I'm a democrat and we must follow that."

In the July–September 2022 Conservative Party leadership election, Howell backed Rishi Sunak to replace Boris Johnson. Howell said he supported Liz Truss after her victory.

Future
Howell has refused to publicly declare whether or not he will stand for re-election at the next General Election.

Other interests
Howell is a Fellow of the Society of Antiquaries (who own and run Kelmscott Manor in West Oxfordshire) and of the Royal Geographical Society.

Books
 Settlement and Economy in Neolithic Northern France, British Archaeological Reports, 1983. .
 Understanding Eastern Europe: The Context of Change, 1994. .

References

External links

Henley Conservatives

1955 births
Alumni of St John's College, Oxford
Alumni of the University of Edinburgh
BBC newsreaders and journalists
BBC World News
Conservative Party (UK) MPs for English constituencies
Members of Oxfordshire County Council
Conservative Party (UK) councillors
English accountants
English archaeologists
Fellows of the Royal Geographical Society
Living people
Officers of the Order of the British Empire
UK MPs 2005–2010
UK MPs 2010–2015
UK MPs 2015–2017
UK MPs 2017–2019
UK MPs 2019–present
Tax collectors
Writers from London
Ernst & Young people